Marion's Girl (1948 bay mare, AQHA #0027822) was a Quarter Horse mare owned by West Texas cattle rancher Marion Flynt, and trained for cutting horse competition by Buster Welch. She was the 1954 and 1956 NCHA World Champion Cutting Horse shown by Welch. She was inducted into the NCHA Horse Hall of Fame in 1962.

Pedigree 

Source:

References

Cutting horses
NCHA Hall of Fame (horses)